Raimo Ilmari Helminen (born 11 March 1964 in Tampere, Finland) is a Finnish former professional ice hockey player. He is often called "Raipe" or "Maestro" by his fans. He is the world record holder for most international games played by a hockey player, as well as for tied for being the hockey player in the most Olympic Games, and his 26 seasons as a professional is one of the longest careers in professional hockey history. In the 2022-2023 season he is serving as the assistant coach of Ilves.

Helminen is credited with invention of the saucer pass.

Personal life
He has a wife, Leena, and two children, Anssi and Nelli.

Professional career

Early years
Helminen has himself said that he developed most of his skills when he was young and spent all his free time playing in outdoor ice rinks in Koivistonkylä, Tampere. Before he focused on ice hockey he had also played football.

Helminen started his career in his native town, playing for one of oldest teams in the country, Ilves. After two gold medals in junior leagues, Helminen got to play for Ilves in the SM-liiga, Finland's top ice hockey league, in 1982. His first international success came in 1984 when Finland won silver in the U20 World Championship tournament in Sweden. Helminen broke the record for most points scored in an under-20 tournament and was selected for the All-Star team. This attracted the attention of people scouting new talent for the professional teams in the National Hockey League in North America. That spring Helminen also took part in his first Olympic Games in Sarajevo.

NHL
The following season he was one of the best players for Ilves, being the second highest scorer for his team and third overall in the league. As the centre of the first line, he led Ilves to a league championship victory for the first time in the league's history.

The New York Rangers drafted him in the 1984 NHL Entry Draft as their second pick (2nd round, number 35), and Helminen headed for the NHL in the fall of 1985. He finished his rookie season with an outstanding 40 points in 66 games. The next fall, however, the new team management sold most of their young players and Helminen ended up with the Minnesota North Stars.

Difficulties and success
The next season proved more difficult, and Helminen ended up playing a lot in the minor leagues. In the fall of 1987 he returned to home soil to play for Ilves again. He proved to be a success and secured a place in the national team for the 1988 Winter Olympics. There he helped his country win their first Olympic medal (silver) in ice hockey.

His performance included 10 points in seven games and assisting two goals in Finland's surprise 3–1 victory over gold medal hopefuls Canada. The tournament left NHL scouts wondering why this player was not playing in North America. Eventually Helminen got another chance to play in the NHL, this time for the New York Islanders.

Back problems and Sweden
In the spring of 1988 Helminen started having back problems that would hinder his career for the next couple of years. Because of this injury his 1988–89 season for the Islanders was a disappointment—although he played spectacularly for New York's AHL Springfield Indians farm team for a month—and he left the Islanders for Malmö IF in Sweden.

Helminen's play in Malmö IF was at times very good and he earned the respect of the fans. However, his back would not heal properly until the summer of 1992 after Malmö had won the Swedish Elitserien, the top ice hockey league in the country. After being Elitserien's first ever foreign scoring winner in 1993, Helminen helped Malmö IF win another championship in 1994.

Late career
In 1996 Helminen returned again to his home town to play for Ilves and quickly became a fan favorite again. In 1998 Ilves won silver medals in the SM-liiga and Helminen was voted the best player of the season. He was also selected for the league's All-Star team in three consecutive years having remained one of the top scorers. In 2014 Markus Palmroth broke the record with 59 PIM. Helminen served as the captain of Ilves from 1999 until the end of his career in 2008, although he was temporarily stripped of his captaincy during the 2006–07 season after being thrown out during a game (he was reinstated after one game). At 44 years of age, Helminen was the oldest active player during the SM-liiga 2007–08 season.

Helminen officially retired after the 2007–08 SM-liiga season ended for Ilves, when they were defeated by Kärpät in the quarter-finals of the SM-liiga playoffs.

International play

Helminen played in a few international tournaments throughout the 1980s and was on the silver winning team of the 1988 Winter Olympics. This was almost the last international glory Helminen was ever to get as then current National team head coach Pentti Matikainen decided that Helminen's time in the national team was over. After Matikainen was fired and the new head coach, Swede Curt "Curre" Lindström took over in 1994 Helminen was re-instated to the national team. In the 1990s Finland began gaining consistent success in international ice hockey. This included World Championship medals 1994 (silver) and 1995 (gold) and Olympic medals in 1994 (bronze) and 1998 (bronze). Helminen remained a favourite pick in the national team consistently through the decade and played an important role in the national team's successes. Helminen participated in 11 World Championships tournaments between 1985 and 2002. Helminen holds a world record of most international games. Helminen played a total of 331 times for Finland and scored 52 goals and assisted 155, totaling 207 points.

His number originally was 14, but he had to change it to 41 when Ilves retired 14 in honour of Lasse Oksanen, a former player of the team. Helminen continued to wear 14 when he played for Team Finland. At the beginning of the 2008–09 season, Ilves announced that Helminen's number 41 would also be retired.

The 2002 World Championship Tournament was Helminen's last World Championship tournament callup since Helminen was dropped as the last player from the 2003 World Championship squad by Hannu Aravirta

In February 2008, Helminen returned to the national team for one game, his farewell match. Finland faced the Czech Republic in the LG Hockey Tournament, which is part of the European Hockey Tour. Although the tournament is held in Sweden, the match was played in Tampere, which is Helminen's hometown. Helminen recorded an assist on a goal scored by Tuomas Pihlman four seconds before the end of the game. Finland won the game 6–1.

In 1998, Helminen and Dieter Hegen (Germany) became the third and fourth ice hockey players to compete at five Olympics, after Udo Kießling (Germany) and Petter Thoresen (Norway). Helminen's appearance at the 2002 Olympics made him the first ice hockey player to compete at six Olympics, with compatriot Teemu Selänne becoming the second in 2014.

Coaching career
Helminen has been assistant coach of Ilves since late parts of the 2009–10 season, when Juha Pajuoja got the job as the head coach. Pajuoja was sacked in late October in 2011 and replaced by Seppo Hiitelä.

He was also assistant coach of the Finnish U20 team in the 2010 and 2011 World Championship, before being promoted to head coach for the 2012 tournament.

Career statistics

Regular season and playoffs

International

Coaching history
Head coach
 Finland U20, World Junior Ice Hockey Championships: 2012, 2020
 Ilves 2013, Liiga
 TPS 2020-21, Liiga
 HC Pustertal 2021-2022, ICEHL

Asst. coach
 Ilves 2010–2012, SM-liiga
 Finland U20, World Junior Ice Hockey Championships: 2010, 2011, 2015
 Barys Astana 2014-2015, KHL
 Dinamo Riga 2015-2016, KHL
 Jokerit 2016-2019, KHL
 Ilves 2022-2023, Liiga

Awards
 SM-liiga, Kanada-malja champion – 1984-85
 SM-liiga, Runners-up – 1997-98
 SM-liiga, Bronze – 2000-01
 Elitserien, Le Mat Trophy champion – 1991-92, 1993-94
 Swedish Division 1, Promotion (Malmö) – 1989-90
 Lasse Oksanen trophy for best player during the SM-liiga regular season – 1998
 Kultainen kypärä trophy for best player as voted by the players – 1998

Achievements
Best Player of Team Finland with Esa Tikkanen and Jarmo Myllys (World Championships 1984)
All Star Team (World Championships 1984; SM-liiga 1987–88, 1996–97, 1997–98, 1998–99)
Most assists (Elitserien, 1992–93)
Most points (Elitserien, 1993–94)
The first foreign player to be the top scorer of the Swedish Elitserien (1993–94)
Best Player (SM-liiga 1997–98)
Most assists (155) and points (207) scored for Team Finland
World record holder for most international games played (331)
One of the only two (with Selänne) ice hockey players who have participated in six Olympic Games: Sarajevo 1984, Calgary 1988, Albertville 1992, Lillehammer 1994, Nagano 1998 and Salt Lake City 2002
International Ice Hockey Federation Hall of Fame (2012)

See also
 List of athletes with the most appearances at Olympic Games

References

External links

1964 births
Finnish ice hockey centres
Finnish ice hockey world championship gold medalists
Ice hockey players at the 1984 Winter Olympics
Ice hockey players at the 1988 Winter Olympics
Ice hockey players at the 1992 Winter Olympics
Ice hockey players at the 1994 Winter Olympics
Ice hockey players at the 1998 Winter Olympics
Ice hockey players at the 2002 Winter Olympics
Ice hockey people from Tampere
Ice hockey players with retired numbers
Ilves players
IIHF Hall of Fame inductees
Living people
Malmö Redhawks players
Minnesota North Stars players
New Haven Nighthawks players
New York Islanders players
New York Rangers draft picks
New York Rangers players
Olympic bronze medalists for Finland
Olympic ice hockey players of Finland
Olympic medalists in ice hockey
Olympic silver medalists for Finland
Springfield Indians players
Medalists at the 1998 Winter Olympics
Medalists at the 1994 Winter Olympics
Medalists at the 1988 Winter Olympics